
Year 250 BC was a year of the pre-Julian Roman calendar. At the time it was known as the Year of the Consulship of Regulus and Longus (or, less frequently, year 504 Ab urbe condita). The denomination 250 BC for this year has been used since the early medieval period, when the Anno Domini calendar era became the prevalent method in Europe for naming years.

Events 
 By place 

 Egypt 
 Ptolemy II forced the Jewish residents of Alexandria to have their torah translated into Greek. Because around seventy translators are used to achieve this, the translation is known as the Septuagint.
 Following the death of the King of Cyrene, Magas, Queen Apama II, Magas' widow, and Antigonus II arrange the marriage of Antigonus' half-brother Demetrius the Fair to Berenice of Cyrene, daughter of Magas and Apama. However, when Demetrius the Fair arrives, Apama becomes his lover. In response, Berenice leads an uprising in which Demetrius is killed in Apama's bedroom.

 Roman Republic 
 In the Punic War, the Romans shift their attention to the southwest of Sicily. They send a naval expedition toward the Carthaginian city of Lilybaeum. En route, the Romans seize and burn the Carthaginian held cities of Selinous and Heraclea Minoa. The Romans then begin the siege of Lilybaeum.
 According to tradition (Horace, Odes, iii. 5), after the defeat of the Carthaginians at the Battle of Panormus, the Carthaginians release Marcus Atilius Regulus from prison and he is sent to Rome on parole to negotiate a peace or an exchange of prisoners. However, on his arrival, he strongly urges the Roman Senate to refuse both proposals and continue fighting. After this he then honours his parole by returning to Carthage where he is executed by being placed in a spiked barrel, which is then let roll down a hill.

 Persia 
 Andragoras, a Seleucid satrap of the province of Partahia (Parthia), tries to gain independence from the Seleucid Kingdom under Antiochus II.

 India 
 According to the Theravāda commentaries and chronicles, the Third Buddhist Council is convened by the Mauryan king Ashoka at Pataliputra (modern Patna), under the leadership of the monk Moggaliputta Tissa. Its objective is to purify the Buddhist movement, particularly from opportunistic factions which are being attracted by the royal patronage.
 The Mauryan sculpture Didarganj Yakshi holding a Fly Whisk, from Patna, Bihar in India, is made (approximate date). It is now kept at the Patna Museum in Patna.
 The Mauryan Lion Capital of Ashoka, is erected as part of a pillar at Sarnath, Uttar Pradesh in India (approximate date). It is now preserved at the Sarnath Museum in Sarnath.

 China 
 Zichu becomes the king of Qin, with Lü Buwei his Prime Minister.
 The Qin general Meng Ao captures the Han cities of Chenggao and Xingyang, thereby establishing the Sanchuan Commandery.

Births 
 Agron, king of the Ardiaean Kingdom (approximate date)

Deaths 
 Erasistratus, Greek anatomist and royal physician under Seleucus I Nicator of Syria. He has founded a school of anatomy in Alexandria (b. 310 BC)
 Gongsun Long, Chinese scholar and philosopher (b. c. 325 BC)
 Hieronymus of Cardia, Greek general and historian (b. 354 BC)
 Magas of Cyrene, king of Cyrenaica (modern Libya) (b. c. 320 BC)
 Marcus Atilius Regulus, Roman general and consul (executed)
 Timaeus, Greek historian who has studied rhetoric under a pupil of Socrates (b. c. 345 BC)
 Xiaowen of Qin, Chinese king of the Qin State (b. 302 BC)
 Zhaoxiang of Qin, Chinese king of the Qin State (b. 325 BC)

References